WJJS (93.5 MHz) is a commercial FM radio station licensed to Salem, Virginia, and serving the Roanoke metropolitan area.  WJJS has a rhythmic Top 40 radio format and is owned and operated by iHeartMedia, Inc. Programming is simulcast with co-owned 102.7 WJJX in Appomattox, Virginia, serving the Lynchburg metropolitan area. The radio studios and offices are on Old Forest Road in Lynchburg and its transmitter is located on Luckett Street near Shenandoah Ave in Roanoke.

Most shows on WJJS and WJJX are either syndicated or voicetracked.  Syndicated shows include Elvis Duran and the Morning Show, On Air with Ryan Seacrest in middays and The Tino Cochino Radio Show heard evenings.

History 
The station launched on March 7, 1969, with the callsign WJLM and carried a country music format for 33 years, last branded as "J93.5, Today's Hot Country". Clear Channel purchased the station and at midnight on December 26, 2002, the format was flipped to Light Adult Contemporary, branded as "Sunny 93.5" and changed the callsign to WSNV.

Just after noon on March 10, 2005, WSNZ at 102.7 FM became a simulcast of WSNV and changed the branding to "93.5 Roanoke, 102.7 Lynchburg; Sunny FM". At noon on December 17, 2007, WSNZ swapped calls and formats with WJJX at 101.7 FM. In March 2011, it was announced that WSNV would no longer be permitted to carry the station on more than one frequency due to broadcast laws. Therefore, at approximately 5:00 P.M. on March 25, 2011, WSNZ split from its simulcast with WSNV and began simulcasting WSFF at 106.1 FM. In late 2012, WSNV shifted more towards a Classic Hits format, slightly changing the branding back to "Sunny 93.5; Hits of the 60's, 70s and 80s" as it did from December 26, 2002, to March 10, 2005. On August 25, 2014, the slogan changed to "70's and 80's Hits".

While the classic hits format was relatively successful, it did have quite a bit of overlap with sister station WSFF; combined with competition from rimshot simulcasters WHTU and WZZI, Sunny was not able to make more headway in the Roanoke market, and WSNV registered a 3.3 share in the Spring 2016 Nielsen Audio ratings, the last ratings book revealed during the format's run. As a result, following their Christmas music stint during the months of November and December, WSNV began stunting on December 27, 2016, with a "Wheel of Formats", running different format blocks that change with every few songs (such as classic country, smooth jazz, urban contemporary, and even all-Elvis) and asking listeners to vote for a new format on the website of sister station WJJS, with said new format debuting on January 3, 2017, at 10:00 A.M. At that time, after 10 hours of simulated construction sounds, the station flipped to Hot Adult Contemporary as "Mix 93.5; Roanoke's Best Variety". The first song on Mix was "Shut Up and Dance" by Walk the Moon.

On May 1, 2019, WSNV changed their call letters to WJJS in anticipation of relocating the format from 104.9 FM, which concurrently changed its call letters to WSTV with the adult hits-formatted "Steve FM" to move from WSFF 106.1 FM Vinton/WSNZ 101.7 FM Lynchburg which were in the process of being sold to Educational Media Foundation. The frequency move was completed on May 30, 2019.

References

External links
WJJS Online

JJS (FM)
Radio stations established in 1969
1969 establishments in Virginia
Contemporary hit radio stations in the United States
IHeartMedia radio stations